Hudson Young (born 11 June 1998) is a professional rugby league footballer who plays as a er for the Canberra Raiders in the NRL.

Background
Young was born in Maitland, New South Wales, Australia. He is of Ukrainian Descent.

He played his junior rugby league for the Greta Branxton Colts.

Career

2019
Young made his debut in Round 3 of the 2019 NRL season against the Newcastle Knights.

In round 25 against the New Zealand Warriors, Young was referred to the match review committee after it was alleged by Fox Sports that he tried to gouge the eyes of New Zealand player Adam Pompey.  Young was subsequently found guilty and suspended for 8 matches.  This was the second time during the 2019 NRL season in which Young was suspended for eye gouging.  The first incident occurred earlier in the year when Young was found guilty of attempting to eye gouge Canterbury-Bankstown player Aiden Tolman.  Young was suspended for 5 matches over that incident.

2020
Young played 18 games for Canberra in the 2020 NRL season including all three of the club's finals games as they made it to the preliminary final before losing to eventual premiers Melbourne.

2021
In the 2021 NRL season, Young played 19 games for Canberra as the club missed the finals finishing 10th.

2022
In round 15 of the 2022 NRL season, Young scored a sensational match-winning try for Canberra in their 20-18 victory over Newcastle, after regathering his own kick.
In round 24 of the 2022 NRL season, Young scored two tries for Canberra in a 48-6 victory over Manly-Warringah.
The following week, Young scored a further two tries in Canberra's 56-10 victory over Wooden spooners the Wests Tigers.

References

External links
Raiders profile

1998 births
Living people
Australian people of Ukrainian descent
Australian rugby league players
Canberra Raiders players
Rugby league players from Maitland, New South Wales
Rugby league second-rows